James Haddow (1872–1943) was a Scottish footballer who played in the Football League for Darwen.

References

1872 births
1943 deaths
Scottish footballers
Darwen F.C. players
English Football League players
Footballers from Kilmarnock
Association football wing halves